Makena Hodgson (born 27 July 2000) is a Canadian luger.

Career
In 2019–20, Hodgson became a full-time member of the Canadian World Cup team. Hodgson's best performance was a 14th-place finish in December 2019.

In December 2020, Hodgson won her first National title.

In January 2022, Hodgson was named to Canada's 2022 Olympic team.

References

2000 births
Living people
Canadian female lugers
Sportspeople from Calgary
Lugers at the 2022 Winter Olympics
Olympic lugers of Canada